The Smale conjecture, named after Stephen Smale, is the statement that the diffeomorphism group of the 3-sphere has the homotopy-type of its isometry group, the orthogonal group O(4). It was proved in 1983 by Allen Hatcher.

Equivalent statements 

There are several equivalent statements of the Smale conjecture.  One is that the component of the unknot in the space of smooth embeddings of the circle in 3-space has the homotopy-type of the round circles, equivalently, O(3).  Interestingly, this statement is not equivalent to the generalized Smale Conjecture, in higher dimensions. 

Another equivalent statement is that the group of diffeomorphisms of the 3-ball which restrict to the identity on the boundary is contractible.

Yet another equivalent statement is that the space of constant-curvature Riemann metrics on the 3-sphere is contractible.

Higher dimensions 

The (false) statement that the inclusion  is a weak equivalence for all  is sometimes meant when referring to the generalized Smale conjecture.

In late 2018, Tadayuki Watanabe released a preprint that proves the failure of Smale's conjecture in the remaining 4-dimensional case relying on work around the Kontsevich integral, a generalization of the Gauss linking integral. As of 2021, the proof remains unpublished in a mathematical journal.

See also 

 Sphere bundle

References

External links 

 

Smooth manifolds
Low-dimensional topology
Theorems in topology
Conjectures that have been proved